Matra is a French company covering a wide range of activities mainly related to automobile, aeronautics and weaponry.

Matra or MATRA may also refer to:

Equipe Matra Sports, Matra's sports car division, former Formula One constructor

Other uses
Mátra, a mountain range in Hungary
Matra, Haute-Corse, a commune of the Haute-Corse department in France, on the island of Corsica
Matra (music), a beat in Indian classical music

See also
Muttrah (Matrah), city in Oman